William Thomas (born 1954) is a Welsh international lawn and indoor bowler.

Bowls career
Thomas won a silver medal in the fours at the 1996 World Outdoor Bowls Championship in Adelaide. Four years later he won a fours gold medal at the 2000 World Outdoor Bowls Championship in Johannesburg with Stephen Rees, Mark Williams and Robert Weale.

He won the 1990 Welsh National Bowls Championships and subsequently won the singles at the British Isles Bowls Championships in 1991.

References

Welsh male bowls players
Living people
1954 births
Bowls World Champions
Commonwealth Games medallists in lawn bowls
Commonwealth Games gold medallists for Wales
Bowls players at the 1998 Commonwealth Games
Medallists at the 1986 Commonwealth Games